Chinle Municipal Airport , also referred to as Chinle Airport, is a public-use airport located  southwest of the central business district of Chinle, in Apache County, Arizona, United States. It is owned by the Navajo Nation.

As per Federal Aviation Administration records, the airport had 131 passenger boardings (enplanements) in calendar year 2005 and 2,059 enplanements (all unscheduled) in 2006.  According to the FAA's National Plan of Integrated Airport Systems for 2007–2011, Chinle is a general aviation airport (the commercial service category requires at least 2,500 passenger boardings per year).

This is one of six airports owned by the Navajo Nation; the other five being Kayenta Airport (0V7), Tuba City Airport (T03) and Window Rock Airport (RQE) in Arizona, plus Crownpoint Airport (0E8) and Shiprock Airport (5V5) in New Mexico.

Facilities and aircraft 
Chinle Municipal Airport covers an area of 357 acres (144 ha) at an elevation of 5,550 feet (1,692 m) above mean sea level. It has one runway designated 18/36 with an asphalt surface measuring 6,900 by 60 feet (2,103 x 18 m). For the 12-month period ending April 17, 2010, the airport had 7,800 aircraft operations, an average of 21 per day: 74% air taxi and 26% general aviation.

References

External links 
 Chinle Municipal Airport (E91) at Arizona DOT airport directory
 Chinle Airport at the Navajo Air Transportation Department

Airports in Apache County, Arizona
Navajo Nation airports